Corey Horsburgh (born 5 January 1998) is an Australian rugby league footballer who plays as a  for the Canberra Raiders in the NRL.

Background
Horsburgh was born in Caboolture, Queensland, Australia.

Growing up in Caboolture, Horsburgh played for the Caboolture Snakes before moving to the Redcliffe Dolphins. He previously represented the QLD Maroons at junior level, playing in the U20s side in 2018.

whilst playing for the NQL Cowboys NYC team in 2016 he represented QLD in their U18s game playing Lock, losing 0-26. He was also playing local league in Townsville for Norths Devils.

Playing career

2018–2019
After previously being under development at North Queensland, he signed a contract to play for the Canberra Raiders and spent his first year, 2018, under development. After being upgraded to a top 30 contract, he made his debut in round 1 of the 2019 NRL season against the Gold Coast Titans. Horsburgh has been nicknamed "Horsepower" for his powerful horse-like on-field aggression.

Horsburgh made 22 appearances for Canberra in the 2019 NRL season as the club reached the grand final for the first time in 25 years.  Horsburgh played from the bench in the club's 2019 NRL Grand Final defeat against the Sydney Roosters at Stadium Australia.

On 7 October 2019, Horsburgh was named at prop for the U23 Junior Australian side.

2020
In round 7 of the 2020 NRL season, Horsburgh was taken from the field after twisting his knee in a tackle made by Parramatta Eels player Ryan Matterson. An emotional Horsburgh walked to the sideline in tears and raised his middle fingers to the empty stand at Western Sydney Stadium. Canberra would go on to lose the match 25-24 in golden point extra-time.

On 29 June 2020, Horsburgh missed the rest of the season with a Lisfranc foot injury sustained during Canberra's loss to Parramatta. He finished his second season of NRL playing in 6 matches, starting in all of them.

2021
Horsburgh scored his first NRL try against the Sydney Roosters in round 12 of the 2021 NRL season. On 10 August 2021, Horsburgh signed a two-week loan deal to join bottom placed Canterbury-Bankstown to help their injury and suspension crisis.

Horsburgh made his club debut for Canterbury in round 22 against the New Zealand Warriors which ended in a 24-10 defeat.

2022
Horsburgh returned to the Canberra club at the start of the 2022 NRL season.  Horsburgh played 22 games for Canberra in the 2022 NRL season including both of the clubs finals matches.

2023
In round 3 of the 2023 NRL season, Horsburgh scored two tries for Canberra in a 24-20 victory over Cronulla.

Controversy
On 2 February 2021, it was revealed that Horsburgh had been pulled over by police on 3 January 2021 and charged with low-range drink driving.  The matter was later passed onto the NRL Integrity Unit.

References
12. https://www.cowboys.com.au/news/2017/03/04/nyc-cowboys-off-to-a-cracking-start/

External links

Raiders profile

1998 births
Living people
Australian rugby league players
Canberra Raiders players
Canterbury-Bankstown Bulldogs players
Rugby league locks
Rugby league props
Rugby league players from Queensland